Powelliphanta marchanti is a species of land snail in the family Rhytididae. It is endemic to New Zealand.

Conservation status
Powelliphanta marchanti is classified by the New Zealand Department of Conservation as a species in "serious decline".

References

Further reading
 Powell A. W. B. New Zealand Mollusca. William Collins Publishers Ltd, Auckland, New Zealand. 1979. 

Gastropods of New Zealand
Powelliphanta
Gastropods described in 1932
Taxobox binomials not recognized by IUCN
Taxa named by Arthur William Baden Powell
Endemic molluscs of New Zealand
Endemic fauna of New Zealand